Anatoli Aleksandrov Nankov (born 15 July 1969) is a Bulgarian former professional footballer who played as a midfielder.

Career
Nankov spent most of his career playing in the Bulgarian A PFG, but also had a spell with GKS Katowice. On 23 July 1997, Nankov was involved in arguably one of the most dramatic matches in CSKA Sofia's recent history, scoring twice to give his team a 3:1 away lead against Romanian side FC Steaua București in the first leg of a Champions League preliminary phase match, but was ultimately sent off and the Romanians succeeded in bringing the score to 3:3. CSKA Sofia were eliminated from the competition after suffering a 0:2 home defeat in the return leg, for which Nankov was ineligible to play.

He has been capped 17 times for the Bulgarian national team, scoring 1 goal, and played two games at the 1998 World Cup, receiving a red card in the first match against Paraguay, which ended in a scoreless draw.

He acted as manager of Hebar Pazardzhik in 2005 and was later employed as the assistant manager to Stoycho Mladenov at CSKA Sofia until March 2015. Following Mladenov's resignation, Nankov was head coach of the "redmen" in one match – a 0:0 draw with Beroe.

References

External links

1969 births
Living people
Bulgarian footballers
Bulgaria international footballers
Association football midfielders
1998 FIFA World Cup players
FC Dunav Ruse players
PFC Slavia Sofia players
PFC CSKA Sofia players
FC Lokomotiv 1929 Sofia players
PFC Spartak Varna players
Chengdu Tiancheng F.C. players
GKS Katowice players
First Professional Football League (Bulgaria) players
Bulgarian expatriate footballers
Expatriate footballers in China
Expatriate footballers in Poland
Bulgarian expatriate sportspeople in Poland
Bulgarian football managers
PFC Hebar Pazardzhik managers